Manuel Cepeda Vargas (13 April 1930 — 9 August 1994) was a lawyer and Senator of Colombia, gunned down in Bogotá on 9 August 1994 as part of a campaign against of the Patriotic Union. A Communist party politician, he had been a Member of the Chamber of Representatives of Colombia from 1992 to 1994, and had served a sentence in prison because of his political ideology, charged for revolutionary activity.

Biography

Early life and education
Manuel Cepeda Vargas was born April 13, 1930, in Armenia, department of Quindío. While studying at the Universidad del Cauca, he joined the Colombian Communist Party in 1952.

Career
In 1958, at the VIII Congress of the Colombian Communist Party, he was elected to the party's Central Executive Committee. He was put in charge of rebuilding the Colombian Communist youth, JUCO, and was made that group's general secretary. In his work with JUCO, he worked with Jaime Bateman Cayón, Hernando González Acosta, Yira Castro (his future wife), Loyal Brown Jaime and Miller Chacón.

Cepeda Vargas was jailed for revolutionary activity in 1964. While imprisoned in La Modelo, he wrote the poetry book Vencerás Marquetalia ("You will overcome Marquetalia"), a tribute to the Marquetalia Republic.

He was a columnist for the weekly Proletarian Voice (later known as the Weekly Voice), which he later directed. The paper continuously denounced the repression of the Colombian Communist Party (PCC), National Union of Opposition (UNO) and the Patriotic Union (UP).

Cepeda Vargas was named Secretary General of the Colombian Communist Party in 1992, succeeding Álvaro Vásquez. He was elected to the senate on the Patriotic Union ticket.

Marriage and children
He married Yira Castro in 1960. (She died in 1981.) The couple had two children: Iván Cepeda Castro and María Cepeda Castro.

Death and afterward
Manuel Cepeda Vargas was assassinated in the streets of Bogotá on August 9, 1994.

A school in Bogotá and a Western Bloc of the FARC-EP front are named in his honor, although his son Iván Cepeda Castro has repudiated the use of his father's name on the part of FARC and has repeatedly condemned the actions of that guerrilla organization, reiterated who “a right and democratic society, like which it loved my father, is not constructed to end of indiscriminate attacks against the civil populace ".

Published works
Vencerás Marquetalia (1964)
Yira Castro : i bandera es la alegría (1983)
Balada de los hombrecitos anónimos (Fondo Mixto de Promoción de la Cultura y las Artes del Cauca, c. 1995)

References

1930 births
1994 deaths
People from Quindío Department
20th-century Colombian lawyers
Colombian journalists
Male journalists
Members of the Chamber of Representatives of Colombia
Members of the Senate of Colombia
Colombian Communist Party politicians
Patriotic Union (Colombia) politicians
People murdered in Colombia
Assassinated Colombian politicians
People from Armenia, Colombia
20th-century journalists